This Is Fats Domino! is the third album by R&B pianist and vocalist Fats Domino. The album was released by Imperial Records in December 1956.

Release history
The album was released on Imperial Records, catalog #LP-9028, in December 1956.
The album was reissued in 1969 as stereo (in fact "Electronically re-recorded to simulate stereo", as printed on cover) by Liberty Records, the new owner of Imperial Records, with catalog# LP-12389.

Reception
The album is included in the reference book 1001 Albums You Must Hear Before You Die. The album sold more than 50,000 copies by February 1957.

Track listing
Except where otherwise noted, all songs by Dave Bartholomew and Fats Domino.
"Blueberry Hill" (Vincent Rose, Larry Stock) – 2:37
"Honey Chile" – 2:00
"What's the Reason (I'm Not Pleasing You)" (Pinky Tomlin) – 2:15
"Blue Monday" – 2:32
"So Long" – 2:23
"La-La" – 2:24
"Troubles of My Own" – 2:27
"You Done Me Wrong" – 2:14
"Reeling and Rocking" (Fats Domino, Alvin Young) – 2:31
"The Fat Man's Hop" (Fats Domino, Alvin Young) – 2:37
"Poor, Poor Me" – 2:20
"Trust in Me" – 2:41

Personnel
Fats Domino – piano, vocals
Cornelius Coleman – drums
William Diamond – bass guitar
Wendell DuConge – alto saxophone
Lawrence Guyton – bass guitar
Robert Hagans – tenor saxophone
Herbert Hardesty – tenor saxophone
Walter/Nelson – guitar

References

External links

Fats Domino albums
Imperial Records albums
1956 albums
Albums produced by Dave Bartholomew